Victoria Complex is a five star hotel with retail and office spaces in Bucharest. The 300 rooms five star hotel a franchise of the Le Méridien brand of hotels.

External links

Skyscrapers in Romania
Hotel buildings completed in 2009
2009 establishments in Romania